The Kings of the World is a 2022 internationally co-produced drama-road film directed by Laura Mora. Set in Medellín, the drama is about five teenage friends who live on the streets. As a result, they leave a Colombian city to start over in the countryside. The film premiered in September 2022 at the 70th San Sebastián International Film Festival where it won the Golden Shell for Best Picture.

Synopsis 
Rá, Culebro, Sere, Winny and Nano live on the streets of Medellín. The five children no longer have any contact with their families. They form a kind of fraternal clan in which they have to make their way in a parallel world without laws. In doing so, they uphold ideals such as friendship and dignity, but also display disobedience and resistance. In a dangerous journey between delirium and nothingness, the group leaves the city and enters the depths of the Colombian interior. There they hope to find a piece of land that Rá inherited from his late grandmother. Like thousands of other Colombians, she was once violently expelled by the paramilitaries. After her death, Rá received the "promised land" through a government restitution program. The boys make friends that help them advance but also warn them of the dangers of their company. They also meet sex workers who provide them with short-term maternity care.

Cast 

 Carlos Andrés Castañeda as Rá
 Davison Florez as Sere
 Brahian Acevedo as Nano
 Cristian Campaña as Winny
 Cristian David Duque as Culebro

Release

Festivals 
The Kings of the World premiered on 21 September 2022 at the 70th San Sebastián International Film Festival. The work was previously screened to international distributors at the 2022 Toronto International Film Festival, along with ten other critically acclaimed films. Other invitations followed in the film festival programs of Zurich (September) and Chicago (October).

Theatrical 
The film was theatrically released in Colombia on 13 October 2022, with opening attendance figures below expectations (28,117 admissions throughout the first 5 days of its theatrical run).

International 
On October 24, 2022, Netflix acquires the film for distribution in the Americas (except Colombia-Mexico), It premiered on the platform on January 4, 2023. Bteam Pictures will distribute in theaters in Spain.

Reception 
Cristóbal Soage (Cineuropa) praised the film as an "extraordinary work" and the director Mora "as one of the greatest talents on the modern Latin American film scene," as well as the young actors of the same name. It is "a hallucinogenic story as cruel and painful as it is fascinating". He also raved about David Gallego's camera work, which captures "the poignant beauty of the Colombian jungle [...] in all its splendor." Soage described the scenes between the boys and the sex workers as "particularly moving". "In the end, we feel that we have witnessed an important work, a portrait of a time and place as comprehensive and precise as it is poetic and moving," says the critic.

Guy Lodge (Variety) saw a "raw, offbeat coming-of-age drama" that transcends the sentimentality that tends to dominate the genre "with a delirious, even surreal energy in its five-story Medellin street children".

Awards 
For The Kings of the World, Laura Mora won the Golden Shell at the San Sebastián International Film Festival, as well as the Feroz Zinemaldia Prize and the SIGNIS Prize from the World Catholic Association for the communication. It has also been invited to international feature film competitions at the Zurich and Chicago festivals.

See also 

 List of submissions to the 95th Academy Awards for Best International Feature Film
 List of Colombian submissions for the Academy Award for Best International Feature Film

References

External links 

 

2022 films
2022 drama films
Colombian drama films
Luxembourgian drama films
French drama road movies
Mexican drama films
Norwegian drama films
2020s drama road movies
Films shot in Colombia
Films set in Colombia
Films about friendship
2020s French films
2020s Mexican films
2020s Spanish-language films
Spanish-language French films
2020s Colombian films